Bent Road is a book written by Lori Roy and published by Dutton (now owned by the Penguin Group) on 31 March 2011 which later went on to win the Edgar Award for Best First Novel by an American Author in 2012.

References 

Edgar Award-winning works
American mystery novels
2011 American novels
E. P. Dutton books